Sariosiyo district is a district in Surxondaryo Region, Uzbekistan. Its capital is the town of Sariosiyo. The district consists of one city (Shargʻun), 4 urban-type settlements (Sariosiyo, Yangihayot, Tortuli, Boʻyropoʻsht) and 9 rural communities (Dashnobod, Navroʻz, Buyuk kelajak, Sangardak, Bogʻi iram, Soʻfiyon, Toqchiyon, Oʻzbekiston, Xufar).

Sariosiyo district was founded on September 29, 1926. It was merged into Denov District on December 24, 1962, and re-established on February 22, 1964. The center of Sariosiyo district is 180 km north of the regional capital Termez.

References

Districts of Uzbekistan
Surxondaryo Region